Su Shi (1037–1101), also commonly referred to as Su Dongpo, was a Song dynasty official, literati, artist, pharmacologist and gastronome.

Su Dongpo may also refer to:
Su Dongpo (1994 TV series), Chinese TV series starring Sun Song
The Poet Su Dong Po, 2001 Hong Kong TV series starring Kent Cheng
Su Dongpo (2012 TV series), Chinese TV series starring Lu Yi

See also
Dongpo (disambiguation)